Libellula incesta, the slaty skimmer,  is a dragonfly of the skimmer family, native to eastern United States and southern Ontario, Quebec, and New Brunswick. Mature males are dark blue with black heads. Females and juveniles have brown abdomens with a darker stripe down their backs. Adults fly from June to August. Larvae are habitat specialists, found in the benthos of permanent lakes.

References

Libellulidae
Odonata of North America
Insects of Canada
Insects of the United States
Insects described in 1861